Sione Fifita (born 17 April 1990) is a Tongan rugby union player who currently plays as a wing for  in New Zealand's domestic Mitre 10 Cup.

Early career

Somewhat of a late developer professionally, Tongan-born Fifita came to New Zealand in his teens and represented Counties Manukau at Under-20 level before having a sensational year playing for their B side in 2014 netting 14 tries in 6 games which unsurprisingly saw him named as their player of the year.   While working his way through the Steelers development structures, he also turned out for Pukekohe in Counties Manukau club rugby.

Senior career

Fifita first made the Counties Manukau senior squad at the age of 25 in 2015.   He scored 2 tries in 9 appearances in a solid debut season at provincial level which saw the Steelers finish in 5th position on the ITM Cup Premiership log, just outside of the play off places.    He was again a regular in the Counties side in 2016, helping himself to 3 tries in 8 games as they reached the Mitre 10 Cup semi-finals before falling to eventual tournament winners, .

Super Rugby

Strong performances during his first year in provincial rugby with Counties Manukau saw him named in the  squad for the 2016 Super Rugby season.   Being an inexperienced member of a squad packed with All Blacks it was perhaps no surprise that Fifita didn't see any game time during his first year in Christchurch, however, he was retained in the squad for the 2017 season.

Super Rugby Statistics

References

1990 births
Living people
Tongan rugby union players
Rugby union wings
Counties Manukau rugby union players
Crusaders (rugby union) players
Tongan emigrants to New Zealand
Tonga international rugby union players